Skipperville is an unincorporated community in Dale County, Alabama, United States. Skipperville has a post office with ZIP code 36374, which opened on November 10, 1853.This community also consists of G.W. Long School, which has won a 2a state championship for baseball in many previous years. This school also has other sports teams with state wide victories.

Demographics

Skipperville was listed on the 1880 U.S. Census as an unincorporated community with a population of 85, but has not been listed on the census since.

References

Unincorporated communities in Dale County, Alabama
Unincorporated communities in Alabama